Varese was a  armored cruiser built for the Royal Italian Navy (Regia Marina) in the 1890s. The ship made several deployments to the Eastern Mediterranean and the Levant before the start of the Italo-Turkish War of 1911–12. She supported ground forces in the occupations of Tripoli and Homs in Libya. Varese may have bombarded Beirut and did bombard the defenses of the Dardanelles during the war. She also provided naval gunfire support for the Italian Army in Libya. During World War I, the ship's activities were limited by the threat of Austro-Hungarian submarines and Varese became a training ship in 1920. She was struck from the naval register in 1923 and subsequently scrapped.

Design and description

She displaced  at normal load. The ship was powered by two vertical triple-expansion steam engines, each driving one shaft, using steam from 24 coal-fired Belleville boilers. Her complement ordinarily consisted of 555 officers and enlisted men and 578 when acting as a flagship.

Her main armament consisted of one  gun in a turret forward of the superstructure and two  guns in a twin turret aft. Ten of the  guns that comprised her secondary armament were arranged in casemates amidships; the remaining four 152-millimeter guns were mounted on the upper deck. Varese also had ten  and six  guns to defend herself against torpedo boats. She was fitted with four single  torpedo tubes.

The ship's waterline armor belt had a maximum thickness of  amidships and tapered to  towards the ends of the ship. The conning tower, casemates, and gun turrets were also protected by 150-millimeter armor.

Construction and service
Varese, named after the Battle of Varese during the Second Italian War of Independence, was laid down by Orlando at their shipyard in Livorno on 24 January 1898, launched on 6 August 1899 and completed on 5 April 1901. The ship made port visits to Algiers on 14 September 1903 and Barcelona on 4 April 1904. During the 1905 fleet maneuvers, she was assigned to the "hostile" force blockading La Maddalena, Sardinia. Varese was present in Athens during the Intercalated Olympic Games in April 1906. Under the command of Prince Luigi Amedeo, Duke of the Abruzzi, Varese was present at the Jamestown Exposition in May 1907. The ship was assigned to the Levant from 1 October 1909 to 20 February 1910 and then based at Suda Bay, Crete from 23 August to 20 September 1911.

When the Italo-Turkish War began on 29 September 1911, Varese assigned to the 4th Division of the 2nd Squadron of the Mediterranean Fleet, together with her sisters Giuseppe Garibaldi and Francesco Ferruccio. While her sisters bombarded Tripoli on 3–4 October, Varese appears to have been deployed seaward to provide security for the Italians. On 13 October, the three sisters sailed to Augusta, Sicily to recoal. The ship escorted two troop transports and a hospital ship on her return voyage several days later. On 16 October, she escorted a troop convoy to Homs and bombarded the town after the Ottoman commander refused to surrender. Bad weather prevented any landings until 21 October and the ship continued to provide fire support for the Italian troops.

Varese and Giuseppe Garibaldi were in Tobruk in January 1912 while the bulk of the fleet was refitting in Italy. Varese is sometimes credited with participating in the bombardment of Beirut on 24 February 1912, but it seems most probable that this was done by her sisters Francesco Ferruccio and Giuseppe Garibaldi. On 18 April Varese and Giuseppe Garibaldi bombarded the fortifications at the entrance to the Dardanelles, heavily damaging them. After returning to Italy later that month, Varese began a refit that included replacing her worn-out guns and lasted through mid-June.

When Italy declared war on the Central Powers in May 1915, the ship was assigned to the 5th Cruiser Division, based at Brindisi. On 5 June the division bombarded rail lines near Ragusa and departed Brindisi on the evening of 17 July to do the same near Ragusa Vecchia the following morning. Shortly after beginning the bombardment at 04:00, Giuseppe Garibaldi was torpedoed by the Austro-Hungarian submarine ; one torpedo passed between Varese and Giuseppe Garibaldi. Struck by a single torpedo, the cruiser sank within minutes, although only 53 crewmen were killed. The division immediately retreated to avoid further attacks, leaving three destroyers behind to rescue survivors. The loss of Giuseppe Garibaldi and the sinking of the armored cruiser  by another submarine on 7 July severely restricted the activities of the other ships based at Venice.

On 15 May 1917, as the Austro-Hungarian Fleet was preparing to attack the Otranto Barrage that blocked the exit from the Adriatic Sea, Varese was at the port of Butrino on the north coast of Corfu. She did not, however, sortie in response to the Austro-Hungarian movements. She became a cadet training ship from 1920 to 1922. She was stricken on 4 January 1923 and scrapped.

Notes

Footnotes

Bibliography

Further reading

External links
 Varese Marina Militare website

Giuseppe Garibaldi-class cruisers of the Regia Marina
Ships built in Livorno
1899 ships
World War I cruisers of Italy